Himmelsheim is a 1989 German comedy film directed by  and starring Elke Sommer, Sigi Zimmerschied and Hanns Zischler.

Cast
 Elke Sommer – Helga Muenzel
 Sigi Zimmerschied – Toni
 Hanns Zischler – Dr. Ehrenfried

References

External links
 

1989 films
West German films
1980s German-language films
1989 comedy films
German comedy films
1980s German films